Parigi Coppelletti or Copelleti (Active in 1590s) was an Italian painter.

Life
Born in Reggio Emilia, he was active mainly in fresco. For the Basilica della Ghiara (whose construction only started 1597), he painted a facade (dell Occa). For the church of Sant'Agostino, Reggio Emilia, he painted a St Nicolo da Tolentino with angelic choir.

References

Year of birth unknown
Year of death unknown
16th-century Italian painters
Italian male painters